Andrew Francis Walker (born 6 April 1965 in Glasgow) is a Scottish former footballer, who played as a striker for several clubs in Scotland and England, including Motherwell, Celtic, Bolton Wanderers, Sheffield United, and Ayr United. He also made three full international appearances for Scotland. Since retiring as a player, Walker has become a television pundit.

Playing career
Walker started his professional career with Motherwell in 1984, helping the club to gain promotion before moving to Celtic in the summer of 1987 for a fee of £350,000. His first season at Celtic Park was hugely successful, as the Bhoys won the double in 1987–88, their centenary season, and Walker himself earned a first Scotland cap against Colombia. The following 3 seasons were less fruitful however and by 1991–92 Walker was out of the first team picture.

After loan spells with Newcastle United and Bolton Wanderers, he joined the Burnden Park side permanently in 1992. At Bolton, Walker returned to his form of 1988, establishing a prolific partnership with John McGinlay as the Lancashire side earned promotion to the First Division in 1992–93. That same season, he famously scored at Anfield to help the Trotters knock holders Liverpool out of the FA Cup. Walker continued in the same vein the following season until sustaining a serious knee injury against Swansea City.

Upon his recovery, Walker was the subject of a surprise bid from Celtic and he returned to Glasgow in 1994. 1994–95 was a mixed season for Walker. On the positive side, he won a Scotland recall and earned his third (and last) cap in October, while his Celtic side won the Scottish Cup in May 1995. In between these events though were the negatives, as the Hoops struggled in the League and suffered a shock defeat by Raith Rovers in the League Cup final. Due to the arrival of Andreas Thom in the summer of 1995, Walker was again deemed surplus to requirements at Parkhead and joined Sheffield United for £500,000 in early 1996. Walker's time in the Steel City was relatively productive; his goals tally a respectable 24.

Nevertheless, Walker was again to quickly fall from favour, and after brief loan spells at Hibernian (where he scored in an Edinburgh Derby), and Raith Rovers in 1998, he ended his career in the lower leagues. This period encompassed short spells with Ayr United (scoring in the Ayrshire derby against former Celtic teammate Gordon Marshall), Carlisle United, Partick Thistle, and Alloa Athletic.

Media career
Since his playing retirement, Walker has worked as a pundit for STV on their Scotsport highlights programme, which he became the main presenter of, alongside Grant Stott, due to Jim Delahunt's departure. The programme was axed in May 2008, due to increasing competition from BBC Scotland's Sportscene. Walker is also writing a column for the Glasgow-based Sunday Mail newspaper.

In 2007/08, Walker began presenting STV's coverage of the UEFA Champions League, as well the station's UEFA Cup matches, taking over from Jim White.

Walker now regularly features on Sky Sports as a color commentator for Scottish Premiership and Cup games. During the 2015–16 season, Celtic captain Scott Brown criticised Walker, labelling him a "poor man's Gary Neville" in May 2016.

In 2021, Walker was prohibited from entering both Ibrox Stadium and Celtic Park after he commented live on-air about Rangers' finances and criticized Celtic's decision to send their squad to Dubai for a winter training camp, which resulted in two players testing positive for coronavirus and others being forced into self-isolation.

Honours
Individual
PFA Team of the Year: 1992–93 Second Division

References

External links

Walker's Wager at stv.tv

Bolton Wanderers Interview
Scotland U21 stats at Fitbastats
 Profile at Sporting-Heroes.net

1965 births
Living people
Footballers from Glasgow
Sportspeople from Rutherglen
Association football forwards
Scottish footballers
Scotland international footballers
Motherwell F.C. players
Celtic F.C. players
People educated at Trinity High School, Rutherglen
Newcastle United F.C. players
Bolton Wanderers F.C. players
Sheffield United F.C. players
Hibernian F.C. players
Raith Rovers F.C. players
Ayr United F.C. players
Carlisle United F.C. players
Partick Thistle F.C. players
Kilwinning Rangers F.C. players
Alloa Athletic F.C. players
Scottish Football League players
English Football League players
Scottish sportswriters
Scottish television presenters
Scottish association football commentators
Scotland under-21 international footballers
Baillieston Juniors F.C. players
Scottish Junior Football Association players
Footballers from South Lanarkshire